Carlos Alberto Gutiérrez Armas (born 3 February 1990) is a Mexican professional footballer who plays as a defensive midfielder.

Club career

Early career
Gutiérrez was born in Guadalajara, Mexico and began playing football professionally for Club Atlas. He played as a defensive midfielder during his time in the team's youth system. He made his professional debut in 2009, and continued playing for the club until 2013. In 2011 Gutiérrez was loaned out to Croatia club HNK Rijeka, playing in ten matches and scoring one goal. He would return to Atlas that same year.

América
On 6 June 2013 it was announced that Gutiérrez was sold to América, recently crowned champions.

Honours

Club
Chapulineros de Oaxaca
 Liga de Balompié Mexicano: 2020–21, 2021

References

External links

 Up to date info
 
 
 Statistics
 

1990 births
Living people
Footballers from Guadalajara, Jalisco
Mexican expatriate footballers
Mexican footballers
Croatian Football League players
HNK Rijeka players
Expatriate footballers in Croatia
Mexican expatriate sportspeople in Croatia
Atlas F.C. footballers
Liga MX players
Club América footballers
Mineros de Zacatecas players
Club Puebla players
2009 CONCACAF U-20 Championship players
Association football midfielders
Liga de Balompié Mexicano players